Matilda Anne Mackarness (née Planché; 23 November 1825 – 6 May 1881) was an English novelist of the 19th century, primarily writing children's literature.

Biography
Matilda Anne Mackarness, born 23 November 1825, was the younger daughter of James Robinson Planché and of Elizabeth St. George. From an early age Miss Planché wrote novels and moral tales for children. As a novelist she took Dickens for her model and in 1845 she published Old Joliffe which was thought to be a satire of Dickens' 1844 Christmas story The Chimes. The following year she published A Sequel to Old Joliffe. In 1849 she published A Trap to Catch a Sunbeam, a brightly written little tale with a moral, and it is on this production that her reputation chiefly rests. It was composed some three years before the date of publication, had gone through forty-two editions, by 1882, and has been translated into many foreign languages, including Hindustani.

On 21 December 1852 Miss Planché married, at Holy Trinity Church, Brompton, the Rev. Henry S. Mackarness, brother of John Fielder Mackarness, bishop of Oxford, and of George R. Mackarness, bishop of Argyll and the Isles, and she thereupon settled at Dymchurch near Hythe, the first parish of which her husband had charge. They afterwards went to Ash-next-Sandwich, Kent, where Mackarness was vicar, until his death on 26 December 1868. He had left very slender provision for his widow and her seven children even though four others had died in infancy. Mrs. Mackarness lived then with her father first at Chelsea, and afterwards at Clapham. In spite of ill-health she continued writing till her death on 6 May 1881 at Margate. She was buried beside her husband in Ash churchyard. She possessed considerable musical talent.

Mackarness's granddaughter Ursula St. George was a child actress in the United States in 1911 and 1912, and an art collector later in life. Ursula St. George's grandson, Eric Brodnax, was a member of the U. S. Virgin Islands equestrian team at the 1988 Summer Olympics in Seoul.

Works
Besides the books already mentioned she wrote: 

 Only, 1849. 
 A Merry Christmas, 1850. 
 Dream Chintz, 1851. 
 Cloud with the Silver Lining, 1851. 
 House on the Rock, 1852. 
 Influence, or the Evil Genius, 1853. 
 Star in the Desert, 1853. 
 Thrift, Hints for Cottage Housekeeping, 1855. 
 Sibert's Wold, 1856. 
 Ray of Light, 1857. 
 Coming Home, 1858. 
 Golden Rule, 1859. 
 Amy's Kitchen, 1860. 
 Minnie's Love, 1860. 
 When we were Young and other Stories, 1860. 
 Little Sunshine, 1861. 
 Coraline, or After many Days, 1862. 
 Guardian Angel, 1864. 
 The Naughty Girl of the Family, 1865. 
 Charades, 1866. 
 A Village Idol, 1866. 
 Example better than Precept, 1867. 
 Climbing the Hill, 1868. 
 Granny's Spectacles, 1869. 
 Married and Settled, 1870. 
 Children's Sunday Album of Short Stories, 1870. 
 Old Saws new Set, 1871. 
 A Peerless Wife, a novel, 1871. 
 A Mingled Yarn, a novel, 1872. 
 Marion Lee's Good Work, 1873. 
 Sweet Flowers, 1873. 
 Children of the Olden Time, 1874. 
 Tell Mamma, 1874. 
 Wild Rose and other Tales, 1874. 
 Snowdrop and other Tales, 1874. 
 Only a Little Primrose, 1874. 
 Rosebud Tales, 1874. 
 Pearls restrung, stories from the Apocrypha, 1878. 
 Only a Penny; a Moral Tale for Children, 1878. 
 Dawn of the Morning, 1879. 
 Only a Dog, 1879. 
 A Woman without a Head, 1892, published from a manuscript which had been lost for twelve years. 

She also contributed to the Magnet Stories (1860–2), wrote a collection of Ballad Stories for the Girl's Own Paper, edited The Young Lady's Book (1876), and edited and contributed several stories to a publication called Lights and Shadows (1879). Some of her tales were collected and published as the Sunbeam Series.

Notes

Works cited

References

 
 

1825 births
1881 deaths
19th-century English novelists
British children's writers
English women novelists
British women children's writers
19th-century English women writers
19th-century British writers
People from Ash, Dover District
People from Margate